Kim Chang-ok (born 27 May 1975) is a North Korean long-distance runner. She competed in the women's marathon at the 1996 Summer Olympics and the 2000 Summer Olympics.

Biography
She was born as the 4th daughter of a father who works in the mining industry. She participated in the half marathon in Daegu. The athlete is an introvert and plays the accordion as a hobby.

References

External links
 

1975 births
Living people
Athletes (track and field) at the 1996 Summer Olympics
Athletes (track and field) at the 2000 Summer Olympics
North Korean female long-distance runners
North Korean female marathon runners
Olympic athletes of North Korea
Universiade medalists in athletics (track and field)
Place of birth missing (living people)
Asian Games medalists in athletics (track and field)
Asian Games silver medalists for North Korea
Athletes (track and field) at the 1998 Asian Games
Athletes (track and field) at the 2002 Asian Games
Medalists at the 1998 Asian Games
Universiade bronze medalists for North Korea
20th-century North Korean women
21st-century North Korean women